The (59272/19579, 19580/59233) Bhavnagar Terminus–Delhi Sarai Rohilla Link Express is an Express train belonging to Western Railway zone that runs between  and  in India. It is currently being operated on a weekly basis.

Then, these coaches are attached to 19579/80 Rajkot–Delhi Sarai Rohilla Weekly Express for its destination Delhi Sarai Rohilla.

In return, five coaches are detached from 19579/80 Delhi Sarai Rohilla–Rajkot Weekly Express and attached to 59233/Surendranagar–Bhavnagar Passenger at Surendranagar Junction for its destination Bhavnagar Terminus.

Coach composition

The train has standard ICF rakes with max speed of 110 kmph. The train consists of five coaches:

 1 AC III Tier
 3 Sleeper coaches
 1 Seating cum Luggage Rake

Service

 59272/19579 Bhavnagar Terminus–Delhi Sarai Rohilla Link Express has an average speed of 45 km/hr and covers 1161 km in 26 hrs.
 19580/59233 Delhi Sarai Rohilla–Bhavnagar Terminus Link Express has an average speed of 47 km/hr and covers 1161 km in 24 hrs 35 mins.

Route and halts 

The important stops of the train are:

Schedule

See also 

 Rajkot–Delhi Sarai Rohilla Weekly Express

Notes

References 

Transport in Bhavnagar
Transport in Delhi
Express trains in India
Rail transport in Delhi
Rail transport in Haryana
Rail transport in Rajasthan
Rail transport in Gujarat
Railway services introduced in 2015